The Great Mass is the eighth studio album by Greek death metal band Septicflesh. It was recorded between July–September 2010 in Devasoundz (Greece) and The Abyss (Sweden) and produced by Peter Tägtgren. The orchestration was written by Christos Antoniou and recorded by the Prague Philharmonic Orchestra. Upon release, The Great Mass received universal acclaim from critics. In 2021, it was elected by Metal Hammer as the 9th best symphonic metal album of all time.

Track listing
All lyrics written by Sotiris V., all music composed by Septicflesh, symphonic tracks performed by the Prague Philharmonic Orchestra.

Personnel

Charts

Release history

References

2011 albums
Septicflesh albums
Season of Mist albums
Albums with cover art by Spiros Antoniou
Albums produced by Peter Tägtgren
Albums by Greek artists